Oru Vilippadakale is a 1982 Indian Malayalam film, directed by Jeassy and produced by P. M. Shamsudeen. The film stars Venu Nagavally, M. G. Soman, Sujatha and Sukumari. The film has musical score by Jerry Amaldev.

Cast
Venu Nagavally as Vishnu
M. G. Soman as Unnikrishnan
Sujatha as Ammu
Sukumari as Swarnammal
Jose Prakash
Sankaradi
Mala Aravindan
Kozhikode Narayanan Nair
Sathyachithra

Soundtrack
The music was composed by Jerry Amaldev with lyrics by P. Bhaskaran.

References

External links
 

1982 films
1980s Malayalam-language films
Films scored by Jerry Amaldev